Al Wajh Domestic Airport is an airport in Al Wajh (also spelled Wejh or Wedjh), a town in Tabuk Province, Saudi Arabia. The Airport was established in 1984.

Facilities

Airlines and destinations

Airlines offering scheduled passenger service:

See also 

 List of airports in Saudi Arabia
 Saudia
 Tabuk Province

References

External links
 
 
 

Airports in Saudi Arabia
Tabuk Province
1984 establishments in Saudi Arabia
Airports established in 1984